Kokshetau Oblast (Kökşetaw oblısı),  was an administrative division (an oblast) of the former Kazakh Soviet Socialist Republic (1944–1991) in the Soviet Union, established on March 16, 1944. Upon Kazakhstan's independence in 1991, the oblast continued to exist until May 3, 1997. It was  formerly known between 1944 and 1993 as Kokchetav Oblast .

Located in between latitudes 53° and 16° N and longitudes 69° and 22° E, Kokshetau Oblast was bordered to the northeast by the Omsk Oblast, to the north by the North Kazakhstan Oblast, to the east by the Pavlodar Oblast, and to the south by the Akmolinsk Oblast. The oblast was located in the northern part of Kazakh SSR (later Kazakhstan), and its territory is currently divided between North Kazakhstan and Akmola regions. The oblast was administratively subdivided into 15 raions and two municipalities of Kokchetav and Shchuchinsk.

The administrative center and the largest city of Kokshetau Oblast was the eponymous city of Kokchetav (Kokshetau), after which it was named.

Geography
Kokshetau Oblast was geographically located in the northern part of Kazakh SSR (modern-day Kazakhstan), on the border of the West Siberian Plain and the Kazakh Uplands.

In 1959, the oblast shared borders with Russian SFSR (Omsk Oblast) to the northeast. The region also touched three other regions of Kazakh SSR: Akmolinsk Oblast to the south, Pavlodar Oblast to the east, and North Kazakhstan Oblast to the north.

Kokshetau Oblast had an area of 78,100 square kilometres.

Time zone
Kokshetau Oblast was located in the Omsk Time Zone (OMST) (UTC+06:00).

Climate
The region had cold winters and warm summers.

History
Kokchetav Oblast was established on 16 March 1944 on the lands that previously belonged to North Kazakhstan and Akmolinsk oblasts, with its seat in the city of Kokchetav. It was subdivided into 15 districts (raions) and two municipalities of Kokchetav and Shchuchinsk.

From 1944 to 1993 it was named Kokchetav Oblast. The oblast was named after its administrative center, the city of Kokchetav.

In October 1993 the oblast of Kokchetav was renamed into the more Kazakh sounding Kokshetau Oblast.

Demographics

As of the 1989 Census, 39.1% of the oblast's population lived in urban areas. The most populous city was the Oblast's administrative center, Kokchetav, with 138,814 inhabitants. Other large cities and towns include Shchuchinsk, Krasnoarmeysk, and Stepnyak.

Ethnic composition
The region was a home to significant minority populations. According to the 1970 Census, the ethnic composition  (de jure population) of the Kokchetav Oblast was as follows:

Russian: 40.0%
Kazakh: 23.0%
 along with Ukrainians, Germans, Belarusians, Tatars and Mordvins.

Administrative divisions
In 1989 the oblast was split into 15 raions and two municipalities of Kokchetav and Shchuchinsk:

See also
 Administrative divisions of Kazakhstan

References

Notes

Sources
 Kokchetav Oblast

1940s establishments in the Kazakh Soviet Socialist Republic
Akmola Region
North Kazakhstan Region
Former oblasts of Kazakhstan